Stari Most may refer to:
 Stari Most, the 'old bridge' in Mostar, Bosnia and Herzegovina
 Old Bridge (Maribor), in Maribor, Slovenia
 Stari most, a former bridge in Ljubljana, Slovenia; see Triple Bridge
 Stari most na Ribnici, the Old Bridge over the Ribnica river, now known as Adži-paša's bridge

See also 
 Old Bridge (disambiguation)
 Stary Most (disambiguation)